John Turbridge (fl. 1589), of Dogfeilyn Llanrhudd, Denbighshire, was a Welsh politician.

He was a Member (MP) of the Parliament of England for Denbigh Boroughs in 1589.

References

Year of birth missing
Year of death missing
16th-century Welsh politicians
Members of the Parliament of England for Denbighshire
Members of the Parliament of England (pre-1707) for constituencies in Wales
English MPs 1589